Indo-European is a major language family of Europe, the Middle East and South Asia.

Indo-European may also refer to:
 Proto-Indo-European language, the reconstructed common ancestor of all Indo-European languages
 Proto-Indo-Europeans (or “Indo-Europeans”), a hypothetical prehistoric ethnolinguistic group of Eurasia who spoke Proto-Indo-European
 Indo people, people of Dutch East Indies and European descent

See also 
 Indo-European migrations
 Indo-European studies, an academic field involving linguistics, anthropology, history, archaeology
 Indo-European vocabulary, a table of the most fundamental Proto-Indo-European language words and roots
 Pre-Indo-European (disambiguation)
 Proto-Indo-European religion, the hypothetical religion of the Proto-Indo-Europeans
 Proto-Indo-European society, the hypothetical society of the Proto-Indo-Europeans